Chelmon muelleri, the blackfin coralfish or Muller's coralfish, is a species of marine ray-finned fish, a butterflyfish in the family Chaetodontidae. It is a reef fish which is endemic to Australia.

Description
Chelmon muelleri is a long-snouted species of butterflyfish which has a silvery white background colour to the body, marked with four wide brown vertical bars and a large black ocellus at the base of the posterior dorsal fin. The dorsal fin contains 9-10 spines and 26-30 soft rays while the anal fin has 3 spines and 18-21 soft rays.

Distribution
Chelmon muelleri is endemic to Australia from the Kimberley Island groups in Western Australia to the southern Great Barrier Reef in Queensland.

Habitat and biology
Chelmon muelleri is found on shallow coastal reefs with very little cover of live coral, where the seabed consists of mud or silt or there is extensive  cover of algae. It also occurs in estuaries. The adult fish are normally observed in  pairs, although juveniles are solitary. It is a carnivorous species which has a diet consisting of worms, clams, tunicates, and crustaceans.

Taxonomy and etymology
Chelmon muelleri was first formally described in 1879 by the German zoologist Carl Benjamin Klunzinger (1834-1914) with the type locality given as Port Denison in Queensland. The specific name honours the German physician, geographer and botanist Ferdinand von Mueller (1825-1896).

Utilisation
Chelmon muelleri rarely appears in the aquarium trade and when it does it commands high prices.

References

muelleri
Marine fish of Northern Australia
Taxa named by Carl Benjamin Klunzinger
Fish described in 1879